Tannenbergsthal is a village and a former municipality in the Vogtlandkreis district, in Saxony, Germany. Since 1 October 2009, along with Morgenröthe-Rautenkranz, it is part of the municipality Muldenhammer.

Overview
Located in the western part of the Ore Mountains, it is also a part of the Vogtland.

The village counts Europe's only topaz rock and a nearby show mine. The Crown Jewels of the United Kingdom contain Tannenbergsthal topazes.

References

External links

Former municipalities in Saxony
Vogtlandkreis